Vitaly Lunkin (born 7 May 1971) is a Russian professional poker player from Moscow, Russia who has won two World Series of Poker bracelets.

Vitaly Lunkin started playing at the WSOP in 2006, finishing 829th in the Main Event. In 2008, he won his first bracelet, winning the $1,500 No Limit Hold'em event and earning $629,417.  The following year, he won his second bracelet and $1,891,018 in the 2009 $40,000 No Limit Hold'em  and finished second to Matt Graham in the $10,000 World Championship Pot-limit Omaha event for $419,832.

World Series of Poker Bracelets

Other poker activities
Lunki works as a professional poker trainer and coach in Moscow.  He is a previous winner of the Russian Poker Tour - Moscow, and of the European Poker Tour - Barcelona super high roller for $1.3 million.  As of 2017, his total live tournament winnings exceed $6,375,000.  His 32 cashes at the WSOP account for over $4,000,000 of those earnings.

References

Russian poker players
Sportspeople from Moscow
World Series of Poker bracelet winners
Living people
1971 births